Vladislav Vyacheslavovich Prokopenko (born 1 July 2000) is a Kazakh football player who plays as forward for FC Astana in Kazakhstan Premier League.

Career statistics

Club

References

2000 births
Living people
Kazakhstani footballers
FC Astana players
Kazakhstan Premier League players
Association football forwards